The Safir T-series is a line of firearms produced by AKSA Int Arms, also known as Safir Arms of Turkey.

Safir T-15 and T-16
The Safir T-15 is a semi-automatic rifle based on the AR-15. It is intended for civilian and police use, but Safir arms makes selective-fire version of the same design as the T-16 for military customers as well as a manually operated version for those who can not legally own semiautomatic rifles.

Safir T-14
The Safir T-14 is a semi-automatic shotgun. chambered in the .410 round that operates on a short stroke piston and outwardly resembles an AR-15.

See also 
 Benelli M3
 Franchi SPAS-12
 Heckler & Koch FABARM FP6
 Fabarm SDASS Tactical

References

External links
AKSA int arms

Semi-automatic shotguns of Turkey
ArmaLite AR-10 derivatives
5.56 mm assault rifles
Rifles of Turkey